Mário Stiebler Dunlop  (born 14 January 1946) is a Brazilian former volleyball player who competed in the 1968 Summer Olympics. He played on the team which won a silver medal at the 1967 Pan American Games. He was born in Rondônia, Brazil.

References

1946 births
Living people
Brazilian men's volleyball players
Olympic volleyball players of Brazil
Volleyball players at the 1968 Summer Olympics
Volleyball players at the 1967 Pan American Games
Pan American Games silver medalists for Brazil
Sportspeople from Rondônia
Pan American Games medalists in volleyball
Medalists at the 1967 Pan American Games